Sir John Lucie-Smith,  (1825 – 9 July 1883) was Chief Justice of Jamaica.

He was born to lawyer John Lucie-Smith in Demerara, British Guiana and trained for the law himself at the Middle Temple in London, where he was called to the bar in 1849. He returned to practise as a lawyer in British Guiana and in 1852 was appointed Solicitor-General of the country. He had become Attorney-General by 1863.

Appointed Chief Justice of Jamaica in 1869 he was awarded CMG in the 1869 Birthday Honours and knighted in 1870. 

He died in Worthing, Sussex in 1883. He had married in 1851 Marie van Waterschoodt, the eldest daughter of Jean R. van Waterschoodt. Their 2nd son Alfred Lucie-Smith was also a colonial judge.

His grandson Euan Lucie-Smith was one of the first mixed-heritage infantry officers in a regular British Army regiment, and the first killed in World War I.

References 

 

1825 births
1883 deaths
British colonial attorneys general in the Americas
Chief justices of Jamaica
Knights Bachelor
Companions of the Order of St Michael and St George
19th-century Jamaican judges